This is a list of members of the Australian Northern Territory Legislative Assembly from 1977 to 1980. Though there had been one previous Assembly, this Assembly was the first to have real power over affairs in the territory, as self-government was only granted in 1978.

 The member for Alice Springs, Rod Oliver, resigned from the Country Liberal Party on 21 August 1979, and served out the remainder of his term as an independent.

See also
1977 Northern Territory general election

Members of Northern Territory parliaments by term
20th-century Australian politicians